Brockham is a village and civil parish in the Mole Valley district of Surrey, England. The village lies south of Box Hill, with the River Mole flowing west through the village. At the 2011 census, it had a population of 2,868.

Name
Brockham, originally 'Brook-ham' (bend in a brook) is so called from the Anglo Saxon meaning 'river meadow by the brook' and is first recorded in 1241. It is often mistakenly believed that there is an association with badgers but this is a modern affectation from the 1950s when Cecily M Rutley created Brock the Badger in a children's story .

Landmarks
On a spur of land to the north west of the village stands Betchworth Castle, originally built by Richard FitzGilbert on land granted to him by William the Conqueror soon after the Norman invasion in 1066, but later replaced by a medieval house which was probably built in the mid-to-late 14th century. Only a few ruins survive today.

Christ Church, the parish church is relatively recent in origin, having been commissioned in 1847 by Sir Henry Goulburn, who served as both Chancellor of the Exchequer and Home Secretary.

Village green
The village green is a focal point for the village. Once popular for its cricket matches – WG Grace is said to have played there – it is a focal point of a Guy Fawkes Night bonfire every year on the closest Saturday to 5 November. It has been at times, the UK's largest bonfire and firework display, believed to date back to the 1880s. Around 20,000 people gather round the village green, over 4 tonnes of fireworks typically light up the sky and the event is widely regarded by local residents as the highlight of the Mole Valley's calendar.  Dorking Rugby Club on Kiln Lane, opens for the event, as the Club House is near to the bonfire. About £20,000 per year in the early 2010s was raised on average for local charities.
There is also an annual Victorian fair weekend in mid July, with a village picnic and firework display on the Saturday evening, also showcasing local talent.

Industry
Agriculture previously provided most of the employment for villagers, although further work was to be found in the nearby Brockham Hills from the mid-19th century, when they were quarried for chalk and hearthstone – an operation run by the Brockham Brick Company Limited until 1911 and by the Brockham Lime and Hearthstone Company until 1936 when the works closed.

From 1945, Beecham Research Laboratories Ltd (which merged with SmithKline in 1989, then with Glaxo, to become GlaxoSmithKline in 2000) operated from Brockham Park at the southern end of the village.
In 1959, Brockham Park became famous when Beecham scientists there discovered the penicillin nucleus, 6-APA (6-aminopenicillanic acid); this discovery allowed the synthesis of a number of new semisynthetic penicillins. 
In 1959, Beecham marketed pheneticillin, followed shortly by methicillin (or meticillin), which is active against the bacterium Staphylococcus aureus ('golden staph').  In time some bacterial strains developed resistance to these antibiotics, such as the MRSA (for methicillin-resistant Staphylococcus aureus). The site became Beecham's Chemotherapeutic Research Centre. The site is now a housing estate.

In August 2018, retrospective planning permission was granted by Surrey County Council for a secondary oil wellbore in Brockham.

Education
Brockham Primary School merged with The Acorns Infant School in nearby Betchworth on 2 June 2010 to create a new combined primary school now named The North Downs Primary School. The merger and name change caused a huge local debate as many people wanted the names and uniform colour to remain the same.

Governance
There are three tiers of local government covering Brockham, at parish, district, and county level: Brockham Parish Council, Mole Valley District Council, and Surrey County Council.

Until 1933, Brockham formed part of the civil parish of Betchworth, which was administered as part of the Reigate Rural District. A civil parish of Brockham was created on 1 April 1933 and transferred to the Dorking Urban District. This parish was classed as an urban parish and so did not have its own parish council, but was directly administered by Dorking Urban District Council. Dorking Urban District was abolished to become part of Mole Valley district on 1 April 1974, and the urban parishes it had contained, including Brockham, became unparished areas. A new parish of Brockham, this time with its own parish council, was created on 1 April 1982.

Surrey County Council elected every four years, has one representative, from Buckland for Dorking Rural: 
Helyn Clack, conservative who participates in these committees:
Cabinet Member for Community Services and the 2012 Games decisions
People, Performance and Development
The Mole Valley local committee (obligatory)
The second party forming the main local opposition in the 2013 election, was the Liberal Democrats gaining 1,527 votes versus the winning candidate's 1,810.

2 councillors sit on Mole Valley borough council, who are:

Demography and housing

The average level of accommodation in the region composed of detached houses was 28%, the average that was apartments was 22.6%.

The proportion of households in the civil parish who owned their home outright compares to the regional average of 35.1%.  The proportion who owned their home with a loan compares to the regional average of 32.5%.  The remaining % is made up of rented dwellings (plus a negligible % of households living rent-free).

Nearest Settlements

References

 Oxford Dictionary of English Place Names

External links

Brockham Green home page
Brockham History home page
Mole Valley District Council
North Downs Primary School

Brockham Bonfire
Brockham Village Hall Club
 

Villages in Surrey
Mole Valley
Civil parishes in Surrey